Manuel Mendívil (24 August 1935 – 15 August 2015) was a Mexican equestrian. He was born in Huatabampo, Sonora. He won a bronze medal in team eventing at the 1980 Summer Olympics in Moscow. He also competed at the 1964 and 1972 Summer Olympics.

He won the individual gold medal in three day eventing at the Pan American Games of 1971 in Cali, Colombia

Mendivil died on August 15, 2015, at the age of 79.

References

1935 births
2015 deaths
Sportspeople from Sonora
People from Huatabampo
Mexican male equestrians
Olympic equestrians of Mexico
Olympic bronze medalists for Mexico
Equestrians at the 1964 Summer Olympics
Equestrians at the 1972 Summer Olympics
Equestrians at the 1980 Summer Olympics
Olympic medalists in equestrian
Medalists at the 1980 Summer Olympics
Equestrians at the 1967 Pan American Games
Equestrians at the 1971 Pan American Games
Equestrians at the 1975 Pan American Games
Pan American Games gold medalists for Mexico
Pan American Games bronze medalists for Mexico
Pan American Games medalists in equestrian
Medalists at the 1967 Pan American Games
Medalists at the 1971 Pan American Games
Medalists at the 1975 Pan American Games
20th-century Mexican people